The North Otago Times was a newspaper published in Otago, New Zealand.

History 
The Oamaru Times and Waitaki Reporter was first published on 25 February 1864. It was renamed the North Otago Times in 1870. It ceased publication in 1932.

References 

Defunct newspapers published in New Zealand
Otago
Publications established in 1864
1864 establishments in New Zealand
Publications disestablished in 1932
1932 disestablishments in New Zealand